Ganes is a 2007 Finnish biographical film directed by Jukka-Pekka Siili. The film is about Finnish rock band Hurriganes, told from the point of view of drummer/vocalist Remu Aaltonen.

The Blu-ray Disc version of Ganes was released on 11 July 2008, making it the first Finnish film released on Blu-ray.

Cast 
 Eero Milonoff as Remu Aaltonen
 Jussi Nikkilä as Albert Järvinen
 Olavi Uusivirta as Cisse Häkkinen
 Timo Tikka as Ile Kallio
 Tommi Korpela as Otto Aaltonen, Remu's father
 Minttu Mustakallio as Eeva Aaltonen, Remu's mother
 Kristiina Elstelä as Remu's grandmother
 Kari Hietalahti as Hurme
 Reino Nordin as Heka
 Leena Pöysti as Satu
 Mervi Takatalo as Paula
 Jope Ruonansuu as Remu's boss
 Daniel Dewald as Richard Stanley
 Martti Syrjä as a warden

References

External links 
 

Finnish biographical films
Films shot in Finland
Films shot in Sweden
Films set in Finland
Films set in Sweden
Films set in the 1960s
Films set in the 1970s
Musical films based on actual events
Finnish rock music films
Films directed by JP Siili
Cultural depictions of Finnish people
Cultural depictions of rock musicians
2000s biographical films
2000s Finnish-language films